The Bawgyo Pagoda is a Buddhist temple in Hsipaw, Myanmar. Built in the 12th century, the temple is located in Bawgyo village, several miles from the town of Hsipaw. Every march, the temple is the site of a Buddhist festival that commemorates the pagoda's founding.

References 

Buddhist pilgrimage sites in Myanmar
Pagodas in Myanmar
Historic sites in Myanmar